Lac des Arcs is a lake in Alberta, Canada, that forms part of the Bow River.

Located within Alberta's Rockies, the Hamlet of Lac des Arcs is on the lake's southeastern shore, while the Lafarge Exshaw Plant and a limestone quarry lie on the lake's northern shore.

The Trans-Canada Highway runs along the southern shore, and the Canadian Pacific Railway main line and Highway 1A follow the northern shore. The lake is also locally known for having a small island with nothing but a picnic bench on it, which is visible from the Trans-Canada Highway.

Municipal District of Bighorn No. 8
Arcs, Lac des
Bow River